Galina Pilyushenko is a former Soviet cross-country skier who competed in the late 1960s and early 1970s. She won a silver medal in the 5 km at the 1970 FIS Nordic World Ski Championships in Vysoké Tatry and finished sixth in the 10 km event at those same championships.

Cross-country skiing results
All results are sourced from the International Ski Federation (FIS).

World Championships
 1 medal – (1 silver)

References

External links

Soviet female cross-country skiers
Living people
FIS Nordic World Ski Championships medalists in cross-country skiing
Year of birth missing (living people)